is a professional Japanese baseball player. He plays pitcher for the Hokkaido Nippon-Ham Fighters.

References 

1995 births
Living people
Baseball people from Saga Prefecture
Indios de Mayagüez players
Japanese expatriate baseball players in Puerto Rico
Nippon Professional Baseball pitchers
Tohoku Rakuten Golden Eagles players
Yomiuri Giants players
Hokkaido Nippon-Ham Fighters players
Fukuoka SoftBank Hawks players